Hellinsia callidus is a moth of the family Pterophoridae. It is known from South Africa.

References

callidus
Endemic moths of South Africa
Moths described in 1913